Meda Station, often referred to as Meda River Station, is a pastoral lease in Western Australia that once operated as a sheep station but presently operates as a cattle station.

The country is well timbered with open grassy plains. A neighbouring property is Kimberley Downs Station.

It is owned by the Jumbuck Pastoral Company and has been managed by Troy Haslet since 2015.

The property was established prior to 1883; a station employee, Henry Thomas Best, died on Meda that year. By 1885 the property was owned by Messrs Marmion and Co. and was hit by severe flooding. Over 1,300 sheep were lost from the property during a cyclone that swept through the area. In 1891 shearing produced 100 bales of wool.

Record flooding hit the area in 1894 following a cyclone. The station manager reported to Marmion that another 1,300 sheep had been lost from the property. Fifteen Aborigines and an estimated 20,000 sheep were drowned during the floods, which left miles of country underwater.

It sold at the reserve price of £5,000 to William Silas Pearse. The following year all of the stock was sold off from the property; a total of 6,400 sheep were advertised for sale.

In 1908 all of the squatters were under fire as being part of a "meat ring", a virtual monopoly of the meat trade in Western Australia.

Widespread flooding followed with miles of fencing being washed away at Meda. The following year the property was carrying approximately 33,000 head of cattle.

In 1943 the station manager, Gordon Harold Smith, was killed at Meda while mustering cattle. His horse fell and Smith received fatal injuries as a result. Heavy rainfall was again recorded in 1945 with another  downpour, which arrived shortly after a dry spell.
 
The land was to be regenerated following land degradation from overstocking. In 1978 the Institute of Ecotechnics acquired the lease known as Birdwood Downs, commencing land care work and offering tourist accommodation shortly afterwards.

See also
List of ranches and stations
List of pastoral leases in Western Australia
List of the largest stations in Australia

References

Homesteads in Western Australia
Pastoral leases in Western Australia
Kimberley (Western Australia)
Stations (Australian agriculture)